Nawab Moulvi Ali Amjad Khan (1871 – 1905) was the Nawab of Longla during 1874–1905. Honorary Magistrate Ali Amjad Khan was educated at St. Edmund's College, Shillong, St. Paul's School, Darjeeling and later at Aligarh Muslim University. He succeeded his father Ali Ahmed Khan at his death in 1874. Nawab Ali Amjad Khan was very successful in increasing the revenue of the Estate many fold. However, on 12 July 1897 there was a cataclysmic earthquake that caused colossal damage to the region and estate. 
Nawab Ali Amjad Khan was a well known hunter, educationist, social worker and philanthropist.

Early life and family
Khan was born on 17 November 1870 to an royal Bengali Shi'ite family in the village of Prithimpassa in South Sylhet, Bengal Presidency. His father, Moulvi Ali Ahmed Khan, was the Nawab of Longla and his mother, Umraonissa Khatun, was a housewife. Upon his birth, his father established the Ali Amjad's Clock in 1874. 

Khan married Syeda Fatima Banu, daughter of Syed Aminuddin Hasan of the Narpati Saheb Bari in Chunarughat, Habiganj.

Career
Ali Amjad had the hobbies of horse riding, polo and hunting. Ali Amjad was an expert hunter, according to records he had single-handedly shot 43 tigers in his own jungle and in other forests in Assam and Tripura. Due to this he received many trophies for marksmanship. Ali Amjad was one of the first tea pioneers in his region and his most notable tea estate was Rungicherra. Ali Amjad was also a well respected educationist in his region by founding the Ali Amjad Government Girls' High School, providing scholarships to students in Karimganj, presenting gold medals to outstanding students in Tripura and by being a member of the Aligarh Muslim University. In recognition of these contributions he received many awards and certificates praising him for his efforts in his region. He also contributed to different sectors of the economy such as finance, logistics communication, postal system, medical and other sectors in his region. In recognition of this the British declared him the Honorary Magistrate of the entire region. In 1895, he visited the Nawab Bahadur of Murshidabad Syed Wasif Ali Meerza who was his close friend. They had a very successful tiger hunt in the hills near Bahadurpur Station in Assam. In 1897 there was a cataclysmic earthquake 1897 Assam earthquake which caused colossal damage to the region and estate. In 1901 Lord Curzon who was the Governor General of India visited Silchar and Nawab Ali Amjad Khan played a prominent role during the visit. During his tenure his family was known to be the wealthiest family in the Sylhet Region. In 1905 on his way to Kolkata he was struck with enteric fever that caused his untimely death at the age of 35. 
Ali Amjad was known to be a very generous and caring man and many stories relating to these qualities are still remembered. There is a popular story about him where he gave away his elephant to a small, poor boy of the area. His sons were Nawab Ali Haider Khan and Nawab Ali Asghar Khan who were both MLA's.

References

https://web.archive.org/web/20110715113231/http://prithimpassaestate.com/history.html

1871 births
1905 deaths
Prithimpassa family
19th-century Bengalis
Pakistani MNAs 1962–1965